Rene Busch (born 19 July 1971) is a tennis coach and former Estonian tennis player. He achieved his career high ATP ranking in 1995 on No.793.

He was born in Tallinn.

He was the all-time singles wins leader for Estonia Davis Cup team. He currently runs his own private tennis school in Tallinn called "Rene Buschi Tennisekool".

References

External links

1971 births
Living people
Estonian tennis coaches
Estonian male tennis players
Sportspeople from Tallinn